This is a list of notable alumni and notable current and former faculty of the University of Tulsa.

Notable alumni

Arts, letters, media, social sciences and the humanities
 Rilla Askew – novelist and short story author
 Louis W. Ballard – composer and author
 Sara Berner – film, television and radio actress and distinguished voice artist
 Ted Berrigan (BA/MA) – poet associated with the New York School movement
 Ridge Bond – Broadway stage actor (famous for playing Curly in the musical Oklahoma!)
 Gibson Byrd –  painter and longtime faculty member at University of Wisconsin–Madison
 Becky Dixon – television broadcaster
 Gail Farrell (BA, 1969) – singer and songwriter
 Jim Hartz (attended 1958–1960) – former co-host of The Today Show
 Paul Harvey (attended 1930s) – syndicated radio personality and author
 Lance Henson (MA) – Cheyenne poet
 S. E. Hinton (BS, 1970) – author of Rumble Fish and The Outsiders
 Ruthe Blalock Jones (BFA, 1972) – American Indian painter and print-maker
 Jerry Keller –  pop singer and songwriter best known for 1959 hit "Here Comes Summer"
 R.A. Lafferty (attended 1933–35) – science fiction and fantasy writer
 Dennis Letts – stage actor and English professor
 Bob Losure (BA, Broadcast Journalism, 1969) – former CNN Headline News anchor and author
 Anurag Mathur – best-selling author of The Inscrutable Americans
 Rue McClanahan (German and Theater Arts, 1956) – Emmy Award-winning actress, known as Blanche Devereaux on The Golden Girls
 Phillip McGraw, aka Dr. Phil (attended 1968–1969) – TV personality and psychologist
 Peter McRobbie – Scottish-born American actor
 Ralph Mullins- jazz trumpet player and film composer
 Mary Kay Place (BA, Speech, 1969) – actress and singer
 John Elwood Price – composer, pianist, ethnomusicologist, and music teacher
 Carter Revard (B.A. 1952) – poet and linguist
 Donald Roulet (BA, Theology) – Presbyterian minister and civil rights activist
 Gailard Sartain (BFA, 1969) – film and television actor and illustrator
 Darren Sherkat - American sociologist
 Joseph Shore – operatic baritone
 Patrick Suppes (attended) – philosopher and longtime professor at Stanford University
 Vu Tran – writer; teaches at University of Chicago
 Julie Ann Ward - Poet Laureate of Norman, Oklahoma, University of Oklahoma Professor
 Jeanne Tripplehorn (attended) – film and television actress
 K. D. Wentworth – science fiction author
 W. Richard West Sr. – painter and sculptor
 Wade Williams (BA, Theatrical Studies, 1987) – actor starring in television series Prison Break
 Daniel H. Wilson – roboticist and author of How to Survive a Robot Uprising, Where's My Jetpack? and How to Build a Robot Army and the bestseller Robopocalypse
 Antonio Zarro – actor, screenwriter, and filmmaker

Business and industry
 Charles Finkel – Beer and wine entrepreneur and innovator
 Michael Kitces – financial commentator
 Doug McMillon (M.B.A. 1991) – CEO of Walmart
 Adrian L. Miller - Music executive and record producer
 Ermirio Pereira de Moraes (BS, Petroleum Engineering) – Brazilian billionaire

Law, politics, and public affairs
 Suhail Al Mazroui – Energy minister for the United Arab Emirates
 Tareq Al-Suwaidan (PhD, Petroleum Engineering, 1990) – Muslim scholar; reformer; TV personality; management expert
 Howard Barnett Jr. – President of Oklahoma State University-Tulsa
 Bradley M. Berkson (BS, Petroleum Engineering, 1985) – US Department of Defense Director of Cost Assessment and Program Evaluation; Assistant Secretary of Defense for Logistics and Materiel Readiness; recipient of Department of Defense Medal for Distinguished Public Service
 Jim R. Caldwell – first Republican member of the Arkansas State Senate in the 20th century, 1969–1978; retired Church of Christ minister in Tulsa; studied in doctoral program at University of Tulsa
 Craig Campbell (BA, Political Science, 1974) – Lieutenant Governor of Alaska
 Samuel H. Cassidy (Law, 1975) – former Lieutenant Governor of Colorado
 William Daniel (MBA, 1985) – former member of the Louisiana House of Representatives from Baton Rouge; petroleum engineer; businessman
 John E. Dowdell (Law, 1981) – United States District Judge on the United States District Court for the Northern District of Oklahoma.
 Kevin Easley – oil and gas executive, member of Oklahoma House of Representatives and Oklahoma Senate
 Drew Edmondson (JD, 1978) – Oklahoma Attorney General and candidate for governor
 Lex Frieden – scholar, disability rights activist, deemed "chief architect of the Americans with Disabilities Act"
 Gregory Kent Frizzell (BA, History, 1981) – United States District Judge on the United States District Court for the Northern District of Oklahoma.
 Ross C. Goodman (JD, 1995) – noted Las Vegas criminal defense attorney
 David Hall (JD 1959) – former Governor of Oklahoma
 Kendra Horn (BA, 1998) – US Congresswoman (Representative-elect for Oklahoma's 5th congressional district)
 Hani Abdulaziz Al Hussein (B.S. 1971)- CEO of the Kuwait Petroleum Corporation; oil minister of Kuwait
 Jim Inhofe (BS, Economics, 1973) – US Senator (R-Oklahoma), former Mayor of Tulsa
 Bill LaFortune (JD, 1983) – former Mayor of Tulsa
 Steve Largent (BS, Biology, 1975) – former US Congressman (R-Tulsa) and Pro Football Hall of Famer
 Robert E. Lavender (JD, 1953) – Oklahoma Supreme Court Justice
 Colonel Michael Mulligan (J.D. 1988) – US Army attorney famous for serving as lead prosecutor in the courts-martial of Hasan Akbar and of Nidal Malik Hasan, the sole accused in the November 2009 Fort Hood shooting
 Elizabeth Crewson Paris (BA, 1980; JD, 1987) – United States Tax Court Judge
 Roger Randle (J.D., 1979) – former Mayor of Tulsa and President pro tempore of the Oklahoma Senate
 Myles W. Scoggins – President, Colorado School of Mines; former energy executive
 Rodney W. Sippel (BS, 1978) – Federal Judge for the United States District Court for the Eastern District of Missouri
 Chad "Corntassel" Smith (JD, 1980) – Principal Chief of the Cherokee Nation
 Steve Young – Former mayor of Kennewick, Washington.

Science, technology, engineering, and medicine
 W. Frank Blair (B.S. 1934) – zoologist
 James P. Brill - member of National Academy of Engineering elected in 1997
 Richard M. Eakin (attended) – pioneering zoologist and Guggenheim Fellow
 Gordon Matthews (BS, Engineering Physics, 1959) – pioneer of voicemail technology
 Laura Sullivan-Beckers – biologist
 Marie Tharp –  geologist and oceanographic cartographer - First to systematically study and first to create a global bathymetric map of the oceans
 Godfried Toussaint (B.S. 1968) - Canadian computer scientist and mathematician (professor at McGill University and New York University Abu Dhabi)
 Harry Volkman – meteorologist, first to issue a tornado warning
 Michael Wehmeyer (B.S., 1980, M.A. 1982) – educational psychologist and pioneer of application of positive psychology to studies of disability

Academic leaders
 Howard Barnett Jr. – President of Oklahoma State University–Tulsa
 Daniel J. Bradley – President of Indiana State University
 Angelique EagleWoman – Dean of Bora Laskin Faculty of Law and scholar of Native American law
 Allison Garrett – President at Emporia State University
 Stacy Leeds – Dean of the University of Arkansas School of Law; scholar of Native American Law; Supreme Court Justice for Cherokee Nation
 Dale A. Lunsford (B.A. 1982, M.B.A. 1985) – President of LeTourneau University
 Myles W. Scoggins – President, Colorado School of Mines; former energy executive
 Patrick Suppes (attended) – philosopher and longtime professor at Stanford University
 Leigh H. Taylor – Former Dean of Southwestern Law School and Dean of Claude W. Pettit College of Law at Ohio Northern University
 Leigh H. Taylor – Former Dean of Southwestern Law School and Dean of Claude W. Pettit College of Law at Ohio Northern University

Scholars, authors and researchers may be listed for accomplishments in other categories.

Sports

 Mike Anderson (1982) – former UAB and current Missouri basketball coach
 Bob Babich – captain of the 1982 team; defensive coordinator, Chicago Bears
 Kathy Baker – professional golfer, NCAA champion and U.S. Women's Open champion
 Tom Baldwin – professional football player, New York Jets
 Don Bandy – professional football player, Washington Redskins
 Dick Blanchard – former professional football player
Steve Bracey (1950–2006) - NBA basketball player
 Bob Breitenstein (born 1943) – former offensive lineman and first Argentine to play in the NFL
 André Bossert – Swiss professional golfer
 Dennis Byrd – professional football player, New York Jets
 Chris Chamberlain – linebacker, St. Louis Rams
 Danny Colbert – NFL player
 Joe Cooper – professional basketball player
 Steve Cox – former professional wrestler
 Ken Duncan – former professional football player
 Junior Etou (born 1994) - Congolese basketball player for Hapoel Be'er Sheva of the Israeli Basketball Premier League
 Jim Finks – pro football Hall of Famer
 Todd Franz – 2005 NFL player Green Bay Packers
 Gus Frerotte (1994) – professional football player 
 Dean Hamel – former defensive lineman Washington Redskins and Dallas Cowboys
 Hank Haney (BS, education, 1977) – professional golf coach
 Steve Harris (BS, sociology 2001) – the university's second all-time leading scorer; former professional basketball player, Houston Rockets; #19 in the first round of the 1985 NBA draft
 Todd Hays (BA, Education, 1992) – Olympic silver medalist in bobsled
Sarah Haskins (2003) - triathlete, won gold in 2011 Pan American games, competed in triathlon in the 2008 Beijing Olympics
 Mark Holata – former Captain Cane Outside Linebacker; professional Mixed Martial Artist
 Damaris Johnson – professional football player
 Jerome Jordan – professional basketball player
 Brian Kelly – professional boxing; fought for the WBC World Light Heavyweight
 G. J. Kinne – professional football quarterback, New York Giants
 Carin Koch – professional golfer on the LPGA Tour
 Steve Largent (1975) – Seattle Seahawks receiver, Pro Football Hall of Famer; former US Congressman
 Clyde LeForce, Detroit Lions quarterback
 Kevin Lilly – NFL defensive lineman
 Tony Liscio – former offensive lineman for the Dallas Cowboys
 Nancy Lopez (attended 1974–1977) – professional golfer
 Tim Martin – football player (Miami Dolphins)
 Jake McGuire - professional soccer player for Örebro SK
 Garrett Mills (2006) – tight end/fullback for the Minnesota Vikings
 Barry Minter – former Chicago Bears linebacker
 Ricky Ortiz – professional wrestler
 Jerry Ostroski – former Buffalo Bills offensive lineman
 Drew Pearson (BS, Recreation Administration, 1973) – former wide receiver, Dallas Cowboys; sportscaster; member of the Dallas Cowboys Ring of Honor
 Chris Penn – former San Diego Chargers wide receiver
 Stacy Prammanasudh (BS, Exercise & Sports Science, 2002) – professional golfer on the LPGA Tour
 Paul Pressey – former Milwaukee Bucks player; unofficially the first NBA point forward
 Dave Rader (BS Mechanical Engineering, 1975–1980) – former college and professional football player; head football coach of the University of Tulsa (1988–1999); former offensive coordinator and quarterbacks coach at the University of Alabama
 Ray Rhodes – former NFL head coach
 Jerry Rhome – former NFL quarterback
 Steve Rogers – former Montreal Expos starting pitcher
 Michael Ruffin – professional basketball player for Obradoiro CAB of the Liga Española de Baloncesto in Spain
 Bob St. Clair – former offensive lineman for the San Francisco 49ers and member of the Pro Football Hall of Fame
 Tracy Scroggins – former Detroit Lions linebacker
 Lovie Smith – head coach, Chicago Bears
 Paul Smith (BA, Communication, 2007) – quarterback, Jacksonville Jaguars
 Ray Smith – football player
 Bob Storey – former CFL player; two-time Grey Cup champion
 Willie Townes – former defensive lineman Dallas Cowboys
 Howard Twilley (1965) – former wide receiver, Miami Dolphins, 1966–76
 Bill Van Burkleo – former CFL player; four-time Grey Cup champion
 Kaye Vaughan – Hall of Fame football player, CFL
 Tyrunn Walker – defensive lineman Detroit Lions
 Howard Waugh – first player to rush for 1,000 yards in the CFL
 Charles Wright – gridiron football player

Current and former faculty
 Larry Catá Backer – scholar of comparative law and international affairs
 Natan Brand – Israeli classical pianist
 Robert Butkin – law professor and former State Treasurer of Oklahoma
 Alfred Corn – poet and essayist
 William A. Darity Jr. – economist (now at Duke University)
 Dennis Denisoff – literary critic and poet
 Robert Donaldson – political scientist and former dean at Vanderbilt University
 Nancy Feldman – civil rights activist and civic leader
 Paul Finkelman – legal historian
 Germaine Greer – feminist theorist (one of the major voices of the second-wave feminist movement)
 Robert Hogan – psychologist known for his innovations in personality testing and organizational studies
 Alexandre Hogue – realist painter
 Tosca Kramer - noted violinist
 Moscelyne Larkin – one of the "Five Moons", Native American ballerinas from Oklahoma who gained international fame in the 20th century
 Pawel Lewicki – cognitive scientist and tech entrepreneur
 John S. Lowe – energy law scholar
 Joseph Wilson Morris – Federal District Judge for the Eastern District of Oklahoma
 Daniel Henry Mueggenborg - auxiliary bishop Diocese of Seattle, former Vice Rector of the Pontifical North American College. 
 Marion Naifeh – Author, cultural studies scholar and diplomat
 Darcy O'Brien – literary critic and author of fiction
 Paul A. Rahe – political theorist and commentator
 Albert C. Reynolds – petroleum engineering expert
 James Ronda – historian of the Western United States
 Robert Sanborn – urban educator
 Paul Scott – British novelist
 Boaz Sharon – pianist at Boston University Tanglewood Institute
 Melissa L. Tatum – scholar of Native American law
 Victor Udwin – comparative literature professor
 Keith Ward – philosopher and theologian at Oxford University
 Yevgeny Yevtushenko – Russian poet, dissident public intellectual and essayist
 Leonard Zusne – psychologist

References 

University of Tulsa people